The International Labour Review is a quarterly peer-reviewed academic journal covering labour and employment studies. It was established in 1921 by the International Labour Organization and is published in English, French, and Spanish.

External links

Sociology journals